Witch Hunter is the second studio album by German heavy metal band Grave Digger. It was released on 10 May 1985 via Noise Records.

The song "School's Out" is an Alice Cooper cover that was originally released on the School's Out album.

Track listing
All songs composed and arranged by Grave Digger, except where indicated. Lyrics written by Grave Digger except where noted

Notes
The 1985 releases from Banzai Records and Megaforce Records and the 1987 Brown Back Cover Press release from Brazilian-based record label Woodstock Discos, contain the four tracks "Don't Kill the Children", "Shine On", "Shoot Her Down" and "Storming the Brain", excludes "Love Is a Game"
"Don't Kill the Children" features an extended, choral intro not present on the version featured on the 1994 Japanese re-issue of Heavy Metal Breakdown. This is considered the original version of the song
 The 1994 Japanese re-issue contains the 1986 album War Games

Line up
Chris Boltendahl – bass, vocals
Peter Masson – guitar, bass
Albert Eckardt – drums
René "T. Bone" Teichgräber – bass on "Love Is a Game" and "School's Out"

Production
Karl-U. Walterbach – executive producer
Jochen Ruschinzik – photography
Hans B. Bruns – design (inner sleeve)
Chris Boltendahl – producer
Harris Johns – co-producer, engineering, mixing

References

1985 albums
Grave Digger (band) albums
Noise Records albums
Megaforce Records albums